Light of Day, Day of Darkness is the second (one-track) studio album by the Norwegian progressive metal band, Green Carnation. Originally, it was released by German record label Prophecy Productions in November 2001.

Background
The album was composed, written and arranged by founding member Terje Vik Schei (a.k.a. Tchort). It is composed of a single 60-minute track and was largely inspired by the death of Tchort's daughter and dedicated to his son, Damien Aleksander, whose baby voice appears a few moments in the song. It is said that 600 different samples were used in the editing of the song.

Musical style
Musically, Light of Day, Day of Darkness is pure progressive metal. In this album, the band combines many different instruments, not commonly used in metal, to create an original soundscape. The album shows some death metal twinges from their roots with Roger Rasmussen / Nattefrost drafted in to perform death growls and Anders Kobro implementing occasional blast beats as well.

Track listing

Personnel
Green Carnation
Terje Vik Schei (Tchort) − acoustic guitar, electric guitar
Bjørn Harstad − lead guitar, slide guitar, ebow
Stein Roger Sordal − bass guitar
Anders Kobro − drums
Kjetil Nordhus − vocals

Guest musicians and singers
Endre Kirkesola − B3, sitar, synthesizer, string, voice arrangements, additional bass
Bernt A. Moen − string arrangements
Arvid Thorsen − saxophone
Synne Soprana − female vocals
Roger Rasmussen − screaming vocals
Damien Aleksander − child's voice
Jan Kenneth T. − male vocals

Children's Choir performed by:
Randesund Barnekor
Marthe Larsen
Julie Pettersen
Mathias Pettersen
Kristoffer Knoff Aamot
Karoline Knoff Aamot
Ida Margrethe Karterud
Thomas Karterud
Simen Ingebrethsen
Christian Albert
Even Albert
Stian Andre Rosenlov
Elin Wikstol − Conductor

Opera Choir performed by:
Kjetil Nordhus (tenor)
Roald Andreas Sandoy (tenor)
Katinka Sandoy (alto)
Maren Stakkeland (alto)
Elise Tverrli (alto)
Nina Tanggaard (soprano)
Therese Fanebust (soprano)
Endre Kirkesola (bass)

Strings by:
Endre Kirkesola
Bernt A. Moen

Production
Produced & Engineered By Endre Kirkesola
Mastered By Audun Strype

Notes

External links
 Official band website (now offline)

2001 albums
Green Carnation albums
The End Records albums